Giuseppina Tuissi, better known as Gianna (also La Staffetta Gianna; 23 June 1923 – 23 June 1945) was an Italian communist and partisan during World War II. She was part of the 52nd Brigata Garibaldi "Luigi Clerici". From September 1944, she was a collaborator of the partisan Luigi Canali (known as the captain Neri) and, with him, had an important role in the arrest and the execution of Benito Mussolini and Clara Petacci.

Early life
Giuseppina was born in 1923 in Abbiategrasso, in the Province of Milan. She lived and worked as laborer in Baggio, a Milan suburb.

Partisan 
In 1943, she started serving as a partisan courier, using the pseudonym "Gianna". On 6 January 1945 she was arrested with Canali in Lezzeno by the members of the XI Black Brigade "Cesare Rodini" and tortured for 23 days. After this period, she was transferred to SS headquarters in Monza by a Gestapo officer, Captain Vernig, who pitied her condition and was impressed by her bravery. On March 12, she was released. Refusing an escape route to Switzerland, she continued participating in the partisan struggle in northern Lombardy. She and Neri were present during the arrest of Mussolini and Petacci, on 27 April near Dongo; and to their execution, the day after, in Giulino.

She was suspected of betrayal and to have revealed names of partisans during her detention. She was arrested in Baggio on April 29 and detained until May 9. She was interrogated by Pietro Vergani, regional commander of the Garibaldi Brigades and PCI member.

At the end of May 1945. she went to Milan with Luigi's sister Alice Canali, to learn more about his death. Despite threats, she continued to ask questions, threatening to reveal what she learned. In June, she met Ferruccio Lanfranchi, editor of the Corriere d'Informazione, that investigated Mussolini's death. Feeling abandoned by her comrades, she disappeared on 23 June 1945, on her 22nd birthday. It is presumed she was killed and her body thrown into Lake Como near Cernobbio.

Her death and those of Neri and other partisans in the late spring of 1945, represent an unresolved mystery of the Italian resistance history. In 1957 Dante Gorreri, PCI secretary of Como, and Pietro Vergani, were charged for the murder as instigators; Dionisio Gambaruto and Maurizio Bernasconi as executors. The trial, held in Padua, did not complete because of a series of procedural impediments.

Literature
Fabio Andriola: "Appuntamento sul lago". Milan, SugarCo, 1996. 
Giorgio Cavalleri: "Ombre sul Lago" Varese, Arterigere [1995], 2007. 
Giorgio Cavalleri and Franco Giannantoni: "«Gianna» e «Neri» fra speculazioni e silenzi".  Varese, Arterigere, 2002
Roberto Festorazzi: "I veleni di Dongo ovvero gli spettri della Resistenza". il Minotauro, 2004. 
Luciano Garibaldi: "La pista inglese. Chi uccise Mussolini e la Petacci?". Ares, 2002. 
Franco Giannantoni: "«Gianna» e «Neri»: vita e morte di due partigiani comunisti". Milan, Mursia, 1992. 
Franco Giannantoni: "L'ombra degli americani sulla Resistenza al confine tra Italia e Svizzera". Varese, Arterigere, 2007. 
Urbano Lazzaro: "Dongo: mezzo secolo di menzogne". Milan, Mondadori, 1993. 
Vittorio Roncacci: "La calma apparente del lago. Como e il Comasco tra guerra e guerra civile 1940-1945". Varese, Macchione, 2003.

References

External links
The last minute of Gianna at antiwarsongs.org

1923 births
1945 deaths
People from Abbiategrasso
Italian resistance movement members
Italian communists